Spiro Sports Center is a 2,100-seat multi-purpose arena located on the campus of Wagner College in Staten Island, New York. It was built in 1999 as an extensive addition to the Sutter Gymnasium, which was constructed in 1951.  The center is home to the Wagner College Seahawks men's and women's basketball team. The Northeast Conference men's basketball tournament was held there in 1999, 2003, 2016, and 2018.

The center also houses a pool, numerous locker rooms, fitness center/weight room, training room, equipment room, as well as offices and meeting rooms for Wagner's intercollegiate athletic programs.

See also
 List of NCAA Division I basketball arenas

Wagner Seahawks men's basketball
College basketball venues in the United States
Sports venues in Staten Island
Basketball venues in New York City
1999 establishments in New York City
Sports venues completed in 1999